The Farmer's Wife is a romantic comedy play by the British writer Eden Phillpotts, based on the scenario of his novel Widecombe Fair (1913). It was first staged in Birmingham in 1916. Its London premiere was at the Royal Court Theatre in 1924. By 1926 when Laurence Olivier went on tour in the lead role, the play had already been performed 1,300 times.

Synopsis
After his wife dies, a farmer goes through an elaborate attempt to persuade one of his various female neighbours to marry him without realising that the ideal woman is already working as his housekeeper.

Adaptations

Film
The source novel was itself made into a separate film in 1928, directed by Norman Walker. The play was twice adapted to film: the 1928 silent film The Farmer's Wife, directed by Alfred Hitchcock and starring Jameson Thomas and Lillian Hall-Davis, and the 1941 sound film The Farmer's Wife, directed by Leslie Arliss and starring Basil Sydney and Patricia Roc.

Television
Two versions of the play were made for UK television: in 1955, adapted and directed by Owen Reed, and in 1959, directed by Patrick Dromgoole as part of the Saturday Playhouse series.

Radio
In 1934, a recording for BBC Radio was adapted and produced by Cyril Wood.

References

Works cited
 Coleman, Terry. Olivier: The Authorised Biography. Bloomsbury Publishing, 2005.
 Williams, Gordon. British Theatre in the Great War: A Revaluation. Continuum International Publishing Group, 2003.

External links
 

1916 plays
British plays adapted into films
Plays set in England
West End plays
Works by Eden Phillpotts